Color Laser Engraving is a marking process that uses MOPA fiber laser source to mark color on metal surface such as stainless steel, titanium, etc.

MOPA refers to a configuration consisting of a master laser (or seed laser) and an optical amplifier to boost the output power. A special case is the master oscillator fiber amplifier (MOFA), where the power amplifier is a fiber device. In other cases, a MOPA may consist of a solid-state bulk laser and a bulk amplifier, or of a tunable external-cavity diode laser and semiconductor optical amplifier.

Disadvantage of colour marking:
Low speed
Colour marking not permanent
Costly

Engraving
Color